Presidential elections were held in Transnistria on 10 December 2006. Incumbent President Igor Smirnov won despite opposition having stiffened during the final weeks of the campaign. Three candidates registered to run besides the incumbent Smirnov: Bender MP for the Renewal party Peter Tomaily, Pridnestrovie Communist Party candidate Nadezhda Bondarenko and journalist Andrey Safonov.

Background
Andrey Safonov's candidacy was at first rejected on the basis of insufficient and allegedly fraudulent signatures, but on 30 November the Tiraspol law court accepted it.

Despite the court ruling, at the Electoral Commission meeting on 27 November Safonov's registration was not accepted with some members claiming that the court decision needed to be challenged at a higher instance. The Commission finally allowed the candidacy on 5 December.

Starting with 7 December, early voting was allowed for those persons for whom it was impossible to come to the polls on 10 December.

Conduct
Andrey Safonov, one of the opposition candidates, suggested that election results were rigged in favour of the incumbent leader. He claimed that there was a strange difference between the exit polls results and the official results and proceeded to challenge the election results in court.

Results

References

External links
BBC coverage
Official news coverage (Russian)
International Herald Tribune 10 December 2006
No surprise: Smirnov wins re-election by wide margin in Transdniester
British election observers' PMR Presidential Elections Report

2006 elections in Moldova
Elections in Transnistria
2006 in Transnistria
Election and referendum articles with incomplete results